The Vélez-Málaga Tram was operating between October 2006 and June 2012 connecting the Spanish town Vélez-Málaga with the coastal town Torre del Mar. It is the first modern low-floor tramway system service that has been taken out of service.

History 
Construction began in 2003, with the service opening on 11 October 2006.

The tram line was not connected through to the city center of Vélez-Málaga – passengers had to switch in the outskirts to a bus line. At the same time, the direct bus service from Torre del Mar to the city center of Vélez-Málaga was kept. As a consequence, the ridership fell from 890,000 passengers in 2007 to 676,000 in 2011.

The city officials declined, and so the extension was never put into service – and with the elections in 2011 the Partido Popular came into power which chose to decline paying for the costs of the tramway system.

Closure of the system was achieved on 4 June 2012 with an initially temporary shutdown of the tram line. The line has not operated since June 2012.

There are plans and a €2m budget to reactivate the line, plans to extend the service west along the coast to Rincón de la Victoria where it would connect to the future Line 3 of the Málaga Metro and will follow the route of the old N-340 road.

Rolling stock 
Services on the line were operated by three CAF Urbos 2 trams. These were leased for use on the Inner West Light Rail line in Sydney, Australia entering service in March 2014. Following the introduction of new CAF Urbos 3s, they were withdrawn from service in July 2015 and returned to Spain.

For the reopening of the line in 2017 the Vélez-Málaga town hall considered buying smaller models.

References 

Tram transport in Spain
Railway services introduced in 2006
Railway services discontinued in 2012
Vélez-Málaga
Cancelled projects in Spain
2006 establishments in Spain
2012 disestablishments in Spain